Tomisław may refer to:

 Tomisław, Lower Silesian Voivodeship, a village in Gmina Osiecznica, Bolesławiec County in Lower Silesian Voivodeship, SW Poland
 Tomisław Tajner, Polish ski-jumper

See also
 Tomisławice, Łódź Voivodeship, Poland